Den Haag HS (English: The Hague HS), an abbreviation of the original name Den Haag Hollands Spoor (The Hague Holland Rail), is the oldest train station in The Hague, South Holland, Netherlands, located on the Amsterdam–Haarlem–Rotterdam railway.

History

Hollands Spoor opened on 6 December 1843, after the Amsterdam–Haarlem railway, the oldest railway in the country, had been extended to The Hague. This line was further extended to Rotterdam in 1847. At the time, the area was a grassland and belonged to the municipality of Rijswijk. Lacking the people to manage law enforcement around the station, Rijswijk ceded the land to the municipality of The Hague. The railway station was named Holland Spoor, after the company which operated it, the Hollandsche IJzeren Spoorweg-Maatschappij. The original building, which was designed by Frederik Willem Conrad, was demolished in 1891 to make way for a Neo-Renaissance building designed by Dirk Margadant.

In 1870, the rival company Nederlandsche Rhijnspoorweg-Maatschappij opened a second main railway station in The Hague, Den Haag Rhijnspoor, on the newly constructed Gouda–Den Haag railway. A railway connection between the two stations was constructed a year later. In 1962, David Jokinen saw an opportunity to put an end to the situation between the two. The plan was not implemented. Despite the plan not being implemented, Staatsspoor station was demolished in 1973, to make way for the Den Haag Centraal railway station. As a result, The Hague has two main railway stations: Centraal Station and Hollands Spoor. Trains from Amsterdam to Rotterdam and beyond (Brussels) tend to stop at The Hague HS, whereas trains from Utrecht and Eastern and North-Eastern directions (also by Leiden/Amsterdam Airport Schiphol/Amsterdam) usually stop at Centraal Station. Several trains in southern direction serve both stations.

Train services

The station is served by the following services:
4x per day International services (Intercity) The Hague - Rotterdam -  Breda - Antwerp - Mechelen - Brussels
1x per hour night train (nachtnet) services Rotterdam - The Hague - Amsterdam - Utrecht
2x per hour Intercity services Amsterdam - Haarlem - Leiden - The Hague - Dordrecht - Roosendaal - Vlissingen
2x per hour Intercity services Lelystad - Almere - Amsterdam - Schiphol - The Hague - Rotterdam - Dordrecht
2x per hour Intercity services The Hague - Rotterdam - Breda - Eindhoven
4x per hour Local services (Sprinter) The Hague - Rotterdam - Dordrecht

Tram services

The Hague's public transit company, HTM Personenvervoer, operates a public transportation hub in front of the railway station's front entrance. Tram lines 1, 9, 11, 12, 16 and 17 stop here.

Bus services

Den Haag Hollands Spoor also includes a bus station. Several HTM bus lines stop here.

References

External links

 Hollands Spoor on the NS website 
 Live departures and cancellations in English
 Dutch Public Transport journey planner
  360/360 Panorama picture of the square in front of the railway station

Hollands Spoor
Railway stations on the Oude Lijn
Railway stations in the Netherlands opened in 1843
Rijksmonuments in The Hague